Djima Oyawolé (born 18 October 1976) is a Togolese former footballer who played as a striker. He played for the Togo national team between 1996 and 2006.

Career
Born in Tsévié, Oyawolé played professionally in France, Belgium and China for Metz, Lorient, Troyes, Louhans-Cuiseaux, Gent and Shenzhen Jianlibao.

Oyawolé made his international debut for Togo in 1996, and appeared in five FIFA World Cup qualifying matches.

Honours
Shenzhen Jianlibao
 Chinese Super League: 2004

References

1976 births
Living people
People from Maritime Region
Association football forwards
Togolese footballers
Togo international footballers
1998 African Cup of Nations players
2002 African Cup of Nations players
FC Metz players
FC Lorient players
ES Troyes AC players
Shenzhen F.C. players
Chinese Super League players
Louhans-Cuiseaux FC players
K.A.A. Gent players
Ligue 1 players
Ligue 2 players
Belgian Pro League players
Togolese expatriate footballers
Togolese expatriate sportspeople in France
Expatriate footballers in France
Expatriate footballers in Belgium
Expatriate footballers in China
21st-century Togolese people